Mill Creek, also previously known as Tierken Kill, is a tributary to the Hudson River.  Poetanock was the Native American name for the stream. 
From its source just west of Snyders Lake in East Greenbush the stream travels southwest, then north and west to the Hudson River. 
The stream has two waterfalls, the Upper Falls on the Mill Brook, and the Lower Falls on the Mill Brook.
Its mouth on the Hudson River is directly opposite Albany New York at what was Van Rensselaer Island, in the City of Rensselaer.

References

Rivers of Rensselaer County, New York
Rivers of New York (state)